Kottakkal State assembly constituency is one of the 140 state legislative assembly constituencies in Kerala state in southern India. It is also one of the 7 state legislative assembly constituencies included in the Ponnani Lok Sabha constituency. As of the 2021 assembly elections, the current MLA is K. K Abid Hussain Thangal of IUML.

Local self governed segments

Kottakkal Niyamasabha constituency is composed of the following local self governed segments:

{ "type": "ExternalData",  "service": "geoshape",  "ids": "Q13111679,Q13114610,Q13113493,Q16136276,Q16135161,Q13110441,Q13111373"}

Members of Legislative Assembly
The following list contains all members of Kerala legislative assembly who have represented Kottakkal Niyamasabha Constituency during the period of various assemblies:

Key

Election results
Percentage change (±%) denotes the change in the number of votes from the immediate previous election.

Niyama Sabha Election 2016
There were 1,98,872 registered voters in Kottakkal Constituency for the 2016 Kerala Niyamasabha Election.

Niyamasabha Election 2011 
There were 1,67,498 registered voters in the constituency for the 2011 election.

1952

See also
 Kottakkal
 Valanchery
 Kuttippuram (State Assembly constituency)
 Kuttippuram Block Panchayat
 Malappuram district
 List of constituencies of the Kerala Legislative Assembly
 2016 Kerala Legislative Assembly election

References 

Assembly constituencies of Kerala

State assembly constituencies in Malappuram district